Methylorubrum zatmanii is a bacterium.

References

Further reading

External links

LPSN
Type strain of Methylobacterium zatmanii at BacDive -  the Bacterial Diversity Metadatabase

Hyphomicrobiales